The Franzosenkopf is a 562 metre high hill in the Harz Mountains of central Germany, which lies about 1.4 kilometres northeast of Lonau in the district of Göttingen in Lower Saxony. To the north of the Franzosenkopf is the Braakberg, a shallow saddle separating them. Flowing around the Franzosenkopf to the east and south is the Kleine Lonau in the valley of Mariental ("Mary's Valley"). To the west the Franzosenkopf is separated from the Kargeskopf hill by the Hackenstieltal valley.

The Franzosenkopf is mostly covered in beech, but spruce also occurs in places. It lies entirely within the  Harz National Park.

Sources 
 Topographic map 1:25,000, No. 4228 Riefensbeek

Hills of the Harz
Hills of Lower Saxony
Göttingen (district)